Karge meri is a novel by Estonian author August Gailit. It was first published in 1938.

In 1981 the novel was adapted to a film of the same name, directed by Arvo Kruusement and starring Merle Talvik, Tõnu Kark, Mikk Mikiver, Ita Ever, Raine Loo, Rein Aren, Aarne Üksküla, Lembit Ulfsak, Ines Aru, Margus Oopkaup, Salme Reek, Silvia Laidla and Arvi Hallik.

References

Estonian novels
1938 novels